The 1999 Indonesia Open in badminton was held in Denpasar, Bali, from August 31 to September 5, 1999. It was a four-star tournament and the prize money was US$120,000.

Final results

References
Smash: 1999 Indonesian Open

External links
 Tournament Link

Indonesia Open (badminton)
Indonesia
1999 in Indonesian sport
Denpasar